Sunnyside is a census-designated place (CDP) in Ware County, Georgia, United States. The population was 1,385 at the 2000 census. It is part of the Waycross Micropolitan Statistical Area.

Geography

According to the United States Census Bureau, the CDP has a total area of 1.5 square miles (3.8 km), of which 1.4 square miles (3.7 km) is land and 0.1 square mile (0.2 km) (4.08%) is water.

Climate
Climate is characterized by relatively high temperatures and evenly distributed precipitation throughout the year.  The Köppen Climate Classification subtype for this climate is "Cfa" (Humid Subtropical Climate).

Demographics
As of the 2010 United States Census, there were 1,303 people living in the CDP. The racial makeup of the CDP was 84.8% White, 10.3% Black, 0.4% Native American, 0.8% Asian and 1.1% from two or more races. 2.7% were Hispanic or Latino of any race.

As of the census of 2000, there were 1,385 people, 561 households, and 420 families living in the CDP. The racial makeup of the CDP was 93.29% White, 5.42% African American, 0.22% Native American, 0.36% Asian, 0.29% from other races, and 0.43% from two or more races. Hispanic or Latino of any race were 0.58% of the population.

There were 561 households, out of which 28.5% had children under the age of 18 living with them, 61.5% were married couples living together, 11.4% had a female householder with no husband present, and 25.1% were non-families. 23.2% of all households were made up of individuals, and 12.7% had someone living alone who was 65 years of age or older.  The average household size was 2.46 and the average family size was 2.88.

In the CDP, the population was spread out, with 22.8% under the age of 18, 7.4% from 18 to 24, 23.5% from 25 to 44, 25.1% from 45 to 64, and 21.2% who were 65 years of age or older.  The median age was 42 years. For every 100 females, there were 88.7 males.  For every 100 females age 18 and over, there were 78.5 males.

The median income for a household in the CDP was $35,500, and the median income for a family was $50,000. Males had a median income of $40,795 versus $22,083 for females. The per capita income for the CDP was $19,852.  About 8.4% of families and 10.0% of the population were below the poverty line, including 24.3% of those under age 18 and 8.1% of those age 65 or over.

In 1990, the population of Sunnyside was 1,506.

Notable person
Ken Barfield, American football player

References

Census-designated places in Ware County, Georgia
Waycross, Georgia micropolitan area